In the mathematical theory of automorphic forms, the  fundamental lemma relates orbital integrals on a reductive group over a local field to stable orbital integrals on its endoscopic groups. Time magazine placed Ngô's proof on the list of the "Top 10 scientific discoveries of 2009". In 2010, Ngô was awarded the Fields Medal for this proof.

Motivation and history 

Langlands outlined a strategy for proving local and global Langlands conjectures using the Arthur–Selberg trace formula, but in order for this approach to work, the geometric sides of the trace formula for different groups must be related in a particular way. This relationship takes the form of identities between orbital integrals on reductive groups G and H over a nonarchimedean local field F, where the group H, called an endoscopic group of G, is constructed from G and some additional data.

However, during the next two decades only partial progress was made towards proving the fundamental lemma. Harris called it a "bottleneck limiting progress on a host of arithmetic questions". Langlands himself, writing on the origins of endoscopy, commented:

Statement

The fundamental lemma states that an orbital integral O for a group G is equal to a stable orbital integral SO for an endoscopic group H, up to a transfer factor Δ :

where
F is a local field
G is an unramified group defined over F, in other words a quasi-split reductive group defined over F that splits over an unramified extension of F
H is an unramified endoscopic group of G associated to κ
KG and KH are hyperspecial maximal compact subgroups of G and H, which means roughly that they are the subgroups of points with coefficients in the ring of integers of F.
1KG and 1KH are the characteristic functions of KG and KH.
Δ(γH,γG) is a transfer factor, a certain elementary expression depending on γH and γG
γH and  γG are elements of G and H representing stable conjugacy classes, such that the stable conjugacy class of G is the transfer of the stable conjugacy class of H.
κ is a character of the group of conjugacy classes in the stable conjugacy class of γG
SO and O are stable orbital integrals and orbital integrals depending on their parameters.

Approaches 

 proved the fundamental lemma for Archimedean fields.

 verified the fundamental lemma for general linear groups.

 and  verified some cases of the fundamental lemma for 3-dimensional unitary groups.

 and  verified the fundamental lemma for the symplectic and general symplectic groups Sp4, GSp4.

A paper of George Lusztig and David Kazhdan pointed out that orbital integrals could be interpreted as counting points on certain algebraic varieties over finite fields. Further, the integrals in question can be computed in a way that depends only on the residue field of F; and the issue can be reduced to the Lie algebra version of the orbital integrals. Then the problem was restated in terms of the Springer fiber of algebraic groups.
 showed for Lie algebras that the function field case implies the fundamental lemma over all local fields, and  showed that the fundamental lemma for Lie algebras implies the fundamental lemma for groups.

Notes

References

External links 
 Gerard Laumon lecture on the fundamental lemma for unitary groups
 

Algebraic groups
Automorphic forms
Theorems in abstract algebra
Lemmas in number theory
Langlands program